The Diocese of Segorbe-Castellón (Latin, Segobiensis; Castellionensis) is a Roman Catholic ecclesiastical territory located in north-eastern Spain, in the province of Castellón, part of the autonomous community of Valencia. The diocese forms part of the ecclesiastical province of Valencia, and is thus suffragan to the Archdiocese of Valencia.

History
No name of any Bishop of Segorbe is known earlier than Proculus, who signed in the Third Council of Toledo (589). He was followed by a succession of bishop until Anterius, who attended the fifteenth (688) and the sixteenth (693). After this, there is no information of its bishops until the Arab invasion, when its church was converted into a mosque.

In 1172 Pedro Ruiz de Azagra, second son of the Lord of Estella, held the city of Albarracín, and succeeded in establishing there a bishop. Pedro's refusal to recognise Aragonese sovereignty extended to his bishop, Martin, who refused to recognise the supremacy of the Bishop of Zaragoza, though ordered to do so by the pope. Instead, Martin swore allegiance to the Metropolitan of Toledo. Four years later, Martin took instead the title of Bishop of Segorbe. This choice of name follows the ideology of the Reconquest, according to which the bishops were simply restoring the old Christian entities only temporarily taken over by the Moors. In this way, the city of Albarracín became the seat of the bishops of Segorbe.

When Segorbe was conquered by the king James I of Aragon in 1245, the cathedral seat was relocated from Albarracín to Segorbe. There arose serious territorial disputes with the Archdiocese of Valencia which claimed rights over several churches in Segorbe. The Bishop of Valencia, Arnau of Peralta, entered the church of Segorbe by force and expelled the prelate. The controversy being referred to Rome, Rome agreed with the Bishop of Segorbe-Albarracín. In 1318 Pope John XXII raised the see of Zaragoza to an Archdiocese, with the diocese of Segorbe-Albarracín as a suffragan.

The Cathedral of the Assumption of Our Lady of Segorbe, once a mosque, was reconsecrated in 1534,
and in 1795 the nave was lengthened, and new altars added, in the episcopate of Lorenzo Gómez de Haedo.Amadó,

In 1577, Pope Gregory XIII, at the urging of Philip II of Spain, separated Albarracín and Segorbe. The terms of the papal bull specified that Segorbe belonged to the Kingdom of Valencia and Albarracín to that of Aragón. The order was well received in Albarracín, but not in Segorbe. The new bishopric of Albarracín was proclaimed a suffragan of Zaragoza, while that of Segorbe was of Valencia.

In 1960 the see became the Diocese of Segorbe-Castellón. Following the De mutatione finium Dioecesium Valentinae-Segorbicensis-Dertotensis decree, of 31 May 1960, the parishes belonging to the Province of València were dismembered and aggregated to the Archdiocese of Valencia. On the other hand, the Nules, Vila-real, Castelló de la Plana, Lucena and Albocàsser parishes that had belonged to the Roman Catholic Diocese of Tortosa were aggregated to the Diocese of Segorbe-Castellón along with the parish of Betxí.

Present day
The Cathedral was elevated to the rank of minor basilica in 1985. Its time-stained tower and its cloister are built on a trapezoidal ground plan. It is connected by a bridge with the old episcopal palace. The Cathedral Museum is located in the upper cloister and its adjacent rooms.

Bishops of Segorbe (6th and 7th centuries)
 c. 589: Proculus (Mentioned in the Third Council of Toledo of 589)
 c. 610: Porcarius (Mentioned in the Council of Gundemar of 610)
 c. 633: Antonius (Mentioned in the Fourth Council of Toledo of 633)
 c. 646: Floridius (Mentioned in the Seventh Council of Toledo of  646)
 c. 655: Eusicius (Mentioned in the Ninth and Tenth Councils of Toledo of 655 and 656)
 c. 680: Memorius (Mentioned in the eleventh and twelfth Councils of Toledo of 675 and 681)
 c. 683: Olipa (Mentioned in the Thirteenth Council of Toledo of 683)
 c. 690: Anterius (Mentioned in the fifteenth and sixteenth Councils of Toledo of 688 and 693)
Episcopal see suppressed (unknown–1173)

Bishops of Segorbe (1173–1259)
Bishops of Segorbe with seat in Albarracín. All the names are given in Spanish:

 1173–1213: Martín
 1213–1215: Hispano
 1216–1222: Juan Gil
 1223–1234: Domingo
 1235–1238: Guillermo
 1245–1246: Jimeno
 1246–1259: Pedro

Bishops of Segorbe-Albarracín (1259–1576)
All the names are given in Spanish:

 1259–1265: Martín Álvarez
 1265–1272: Pedro Garcés
 1272–1277: Pedro Jiménez de Segura
 1284–1288: Miguel Sánchez
 1288–1301: Aparicio
 1302–1318: Antonio Muñoz
 1319–1356: Sancho Dull
 1356–1362: Elías
 1362–1369: Juan Martínez de Barcelona
 1369–1387: Iñigo de Valterra
 1387–1400: Diego de Heredia
 1400–1409: Francisco Riquer y Bastero
 1410–1427: Juan de Tauste
 1428–1437: Francisco de Aguiló
 1438–1445: Jaime Gerart
 1445–1454: Gisberto Pardo de la Casta
 1455–1459: Luis de Milá y Borja
 1461–1473: Pedro Baldó
 1473–1498: Bartolomé Martí
 1498–1499: Juan Marrades
 1500–1530: Gilberto Martí
 1530–1556: Gaspar Jofre de Borja
 1556–1571: Juan de Muñatones
 1571–1576: Francisco de Soto Salazar

Bishops of Segorbe (1577–1960)
 1577–1578: Francisco Sancho
 1579–1582: Gil Ruiz de Liori
 1583–1591: Martín de Salvatierra
 1591–1597: Juan Bautista Pérez Rubert
 1599–1609: Feliciano de Figueroa
 1610–1635: Pedro Ginés de Casanova
 1636–1638: Juan Bautista Pellicer
 1639–1652: Diego Serrano de Sotomayor
 1652–1660: Francisco Gavaldá
 1661–1672: Anastasio Vives de Rocamora
 1673–1679: José Sanchís y Ferrandis
 1680–1691: Crisóstomo Royo de Castellví
 1691–1707: Antonio Ferrer y Milán
 1708–1714: Rodrigo Marín Rubio
 1714–1730: Diego Muños de Baquerizo
 1731–1748: Francisco de Cepeda y Guerrero
 1749–1751: Francisco Cuartero
 1751–1757: Pedro Fernández Velarde
 1758–1770: Blas de Arganda
 1770–1780: Alonso Cano
 1780–1781: Lorenzo Lay Anzano
 1783–1808: Lorenzo Gómez de Haedo
 1814–1816: Lorenzo Algüero Ribera
 1816–1821: Francisco de la Dueña Cisneros
 1822–1824: Vicente Ramos García (Elected)
 1825–1837: Juan Sanz Palanco
 1847–1864: Domingo Canubio y Alberto
 1865–1868: Joaquín Hernández Herrero
 1868–1875: José Luis Montagut
 1876–1880: Mariano Miguel Gómez
 1880–1899: Francisco Aguilar
 1900–1907: Manuel García Cerero y Soler
 1907–1911: Antonio María Massanet
 1913–1934: Luis Amigó Ferrer
 1936–1936: Miguel de los Santos Serra y Sucarrats
 1944–1950: Ramón Sanahuja y Marcé
 1951–1960: José Pont y Gol

Bishops of Segorbe-Castellón (since 1960)
 1960–1970: José Pont y Gol
 1971–1996: José María Cases Deordal
 1996–2005: Juan Antonio Reig Pla
 2006–today: Casimiro López Llorente

See also
 List of the Roman Catholic dioceses of Spain
 Roman Catholic Diocese of Albarracín
 Segorbe Cathedral

References

Sources
 
 IBERCRONOX: Obispado de Segorbe-Castellón (Segóbriga) 

Valencian Community
Segorbe-Castellon
Religious organizations established in the 1170s
Roman Catholic dioceses established in the 12th century